The Capricorn Highway is located in Central Queensland, Australia, and links the city of Rockhampton with western Queensland. Formerly National Route 66, Queensland began to convert to the alphanumeric system much of Australia had adopted in the early-2000s and is now designated as A4. The highway runs parallel with the Tropic of Capricorn, hence its name.

Other towns situated along the highway include (from east to west):
Gracemere, Kabra, Stanwell, Westwood, Gogango, Duaringa, Dingo, Bluff, Blackwater, Comet, Emerald, Bogantungan, Alpha and Jericho.

Running virtually east/west, the highway traverses the area known as the Central Highlands, and crosses the Great Dividing Range between Alpha and Jericho.

Northern Australia Roads Program upgrade
The Northern Australia Roads Program announced in 2016 included the following project for the Capricorn Highway.

Highway duplication
The project to duplicate the section between Rockhampton and Gracemere was completed in mid 2021 at a total cost of $75 million. This will facilitate the construction of the south-western entry to the proposed Rockhampton Ring Road.

Northern Australian Beef Roads Upgrade
The Northern Australia Beef Roads Program announced in 2016 included the following project:

Road train access to Rockhampton (stage 2)
The project for upgrading between Gracemere saleyards and the Rockhampton abattoirs to provide access for Type 1 Road Trains was completed by early 2021 at a total cost of $30 million.
 Capricorn Highway - from Saleyards Road at Gracemere to the Bruce Highway roundabout at Rochhampton.
 Bruce Highway - from the Capricorn Highway roundabout to the Yaamba Road intersection.
 Rockhampton-Yeppoon Road - from the Bruce Highway intersection south-west to the Emu Park Road intersection (.

Roads of strategic importance upgrades
The Roads of Strategic Importance initiative, last updated in March 2022, included the following projects for the Capricorn Highway.

Corridor upgrade
A lead project to upgrade the Mount Isa to Rockhampton corridor, including sections of the Capricorn and Landsborough Highways and surrounding state and council roads, at an estimated cost of $237.5 million, was in the planning and scoping stage. Works are expected to include progressive sealing, lane duplications and crossing upgrades.

Intersection upgrade Gregory Highway
This project was targeted for "early works" by the Queensland Government.

Other upgrades

Intersection upgrade
A project to upgrade an intersection in Blackwater, at a cost of $6.24 million, was expected to finish in early 2022.

Pavement strengthening and/or widening
A project to strengthen and widen pavement just east of Emerald, at a cost of $5 million, was expected to finish in mid-2022.

A project to widen pavement east of Alpha, at a cost of $9.65 million, was due for completion in late 2022.

Major intersections

See also

 Highways in Australia
 List of highways in Queensland

References

Highways in Queensland